Wichmann I the Elder (also spelled Wigmann or Wichman) (died 23 April 944) was a member of the Saxon House of Billung. He was a brother of Amelung, Bishop of Verden, and Herman, Duke of Saxony.

Biography 
In 938, Wichmann rebelled because his younger brother Herman had been given military command of the northern reaches of the Duchy of Saxony. He believed that he had a better claim to the office by virtue of his seniority and his Königsnähe (closeness to the king), because he was related by marriage to the queen dowager Matilda. He was joined by Eberhard of Franconia, and Thankmar, the half-brother of King Otto I. The revolt was soon suppressed. Thankmar died the same year he and Eberhard came to terms. Wichmann allied with some Slavs and made war against his former compatriots. He reconciled to Otto in 941.

Personal life 
Wichmann married Frederuna (or Fridaruna), niece of Queen Matilda. She became a nun after her husband's death and died on 18 January 971. She left him at least three sons and a daughter:
Wichmann II
Bruno, Bishop of Verden
Egbert the One-Eyed
Hathui, married Siegfried, son of Gero the Great, possibly mother of Gero, Count of Alsleben.
Wichmann and Frederuna may have been the parents of Dietrich, Margrave of the Nordmark.

Sources
 
Thompson, James Westfall. Feudal Germany, Volume II. New York: Frederick Ungar Publishing Co., 1928.
Bernhardt, John W. Itinerant Kingship and Royal Monasteries in Early Medieval Germany, c. 936–1075. Cambridge: Cambridge University Press, 1993.

Notes

944 deaths
Dukes of Saxony
House of Billung
Year of birth unknown
Counts of Stade
10th-century Saxon people